The Middle Santiam River is a tributary of the South Santiam River,  long, in western Oregon in the United States. It drains a remote area of the Cascade Range east of Sweet Home in the watershed of the Willamette River.

It rises in the Cascades in eastern Linn County in the Willamette National Forest, about half a mile west of Iron Mountain. It flows briefly north, then generally west and southwest through the mountains and Middle Santiam Wilderness. In central Linn County it is impounded at the Green Peter Dam to form the Green Peter Reservoir.

Tributaries
Named tributaries of the Middle Santiam River from source to mouth are Cougar, Holman, Lake, South Pyramid, Bachelor, Pyramid, Donaca, Jude, and Egg creeks, followed by Fitt, Chimney, Sixes, Bear, and Twin Falls creeks. Below that are Cougar, Crash, Maple, Elk, Knickerbocker and Cave creeks. Then come Tally, Quartzville, Whitcomb, Rumbaugh, and Thistle creeks. Finally are Green Peter, Little Bottom, Alder, Coal, and Lewis creeks.

See also
List of Oregon rivers
Willamette Riverkeeper

References

External links

North Santiam Watershed Council
South Santiam Watershed Council
Willamette Riverkeeper

Rivers of Oregon
Rivers of Linn County, Oregon